The Ellensburg Rodeo opens every Labor Day weekend along with the Kittitas County Fair in Ellensburg, Washington.  Started in 1923, the Ellensburg Rodeo has grown from a local competition among ranch hands to the Professional event of today with over 500 contestants and prize money in excess of $250,000.  Within the Pacific Northwest, the Ellensburg Rodeo is second in size only to the Calgary Stampede in Calgary, Alberta, and is considered to be one of America's top 25 rodeos. The Ellensburg Rodeo was inducted to the ProRodeo Hall of Fame in 2020.

The rodeo went on hiatus from 1942 to 1944 and 2020.

Ellensburg Rodeo Hall of Fame

See also
 Rodeo
 List of Rodeos
 Professional Rodeo Cowboys Association
 ProRodeo Hall of Fame
 Dan Collins Taylor

References

External links
OfficialSite

Tourist attractions in Kittitas County, Washington
ProRodeo Hall of Fame inductees
Rodeos